Bornheimer is a surname. Notable people with the surname include:

Jake Bornheimer (1927–1986), American basketball player
James Bornheimer (1933–1993), American politician
Kyle Bornheimer (born 1975), American actor and comedian

See also
Bernheimer